Simone di Nanni Ferrucci (born 1402) was an Italian sculptor. His date of death is unknown.

Ferrucci was born in Fiesole into a family of artists, including his son Simone Ferrucci and his nephew Andrea Ferrucci. Ferrucci primarily produced religious-themed sculptures for commissions.

References

15th-century Italian sculptors
Italian male sculptors
1402 births
People from Fiesole
Year of death unknown